Kovač is a municipality and village in Jičín District in the Hradec Králové Region of the Czech Republic. It has about 100 inhabitants.

Notable people
Carl Patsch (1865–1945), Slavist, Albanologist, archaeologist and historian

References

Villages in Jičín District